The  is one of the national seals of Japan and is used as the official seal of state.

Description
The seal is made from pure gold, measures 3 sun (about 9 cm) and weighs 4.5 kg. It is written vertically in two lines, with the right-hand side containing the characters  (Dai Nippon), and the left-hand side containing the characters  (Kokuji).

The seal is stored in a specially designated leather bag. When used, a special ruler is used to make sure the seal is imprinted correctly, and the cinnabar seal ink is specially made by the National Printing Bureau so that it will not bend or shift.

History
Abei Rekido, the Kyoto-based master-hand of the seal  of Kyoto was ordered to produce the seal, and he manufactured it with the Privy Seal of Japan in one year in 1874.

Under the Meiji Constitution, the cases where the Privy Seal or State Seal is used was defined on the official note formula (: kōbunshiki 1886–1907) and the official formula code (: kōreisiki 1907–1947). However, the code was abolished with the enforcement of the Constitution of Japan, with no replacement statute. If the State Seal or the Privy Seal are illegally reproduced, the penalty is at least two years or more of terminable penal servitude according to Article 164 of the 1st clause of the criminal code.

At the 2019 Japanese imperial transition, the State Seal – together with the Privy Seal and two of the Imperial Regalia – featured twice during the ceremonies: During the abdication of Emperor Akihito on 30 April, and during the accession of Emperor Naruhito on 1 May, chamberlains carried the seals into the Hall of Pines, where they were placed on tables near the reigning Emperor.

See also
National seals of Japan
Imperial Seal of China
National Seals of the Republic of China
Seal of the State Council of the People's Republic of China
Seal of South Korea

References

External links 
Emperor Showa signing documents and using the State and Privy Seal of Japan 

 

Japan
National symbols of Japan
Government of Japan
Japanese heraldry